The 2017 Kentucky Bank Tennis Championships was a professional tennis tournament played on outdoor hard courts. It was the 22nd edition, for men, and 20th edition, for women, of the tournament and part of the 2017 ATP Challenger Tour and the 2017 ITF Women's Circuit. It took place in Lexington, Kentucky, United States, on 31 July – 6 August 2017.

Men's singles main draw entrants

Seeds

 1 Rankings as of 24 July 2017.

Other entrants
The following players received a wildcard into the singles main draw:
  William Bushamuka
  Eric Quigley
  Martin Redlicki
  Michael Redlicki

The following players received entry into the singles main draw using a protected ranking:
  Tom Jomby
  Kevin King

The following player received entry into the singles main draw as a special exempt:
  Cameron Norrie

The following players received entry from the qualifying draw:
  JC Aragone
  Ryan Haviland
  Christopher Rungkat
  Jesse Witten

The following players received entry as lucky losers:
  Mark Verryth
  Trey Yates

Women's singles main draw entrants

Seeds

 1 Rankings as of 24 July 2017.

Other entrants
The following players received a wildcard into the singles main draw:
  Emina Bektas
  Allie Kiick
  Taysia Rogers
  Anna Tatishvili

The following players received entry from the qualifying draw:
  Anastasia Nefedova
  María Camila Osorio Serrano
  Erin Routliffe
  Daniela Vismane

The following player received entry as a Lucky Loser:
  Chanelle Van Nguyen

Champions

Men's singles

 Michael Mmoh def.  John Millman 4–6, 7–6(7–3), 6–3.

Women's singles

 Grace Min def.  Sofia Kenin, 6–4, 6–1

Men's doubles

 Alex Bolt /  Max Purcell def.  Tom Jomby /  Eric Quigley 7–5, 6–4.

Women's doubles

 Priscilla Hon /  Vera Lapko def.  Hiroko Kuwata /  Valeria Savinykh, 6–3, 6–4

External links
 Official website

2017 ITF Women's Circuit
Kentucky Bank Tennis Championships
2017 in American tennis
2017